Mutou Valley is located in the Flaming Mountains, near the ancient oasis city of Gaochang on the rim of the Taklamakan Desert  in the Xinjiang Autonomous Region, China. Under a cliff in the Mutou Valley is located the Bezeklik Thousand Buddha Caves, a complex of Buddhist caves temples dating from the 5th to the 9th centuries.

Footnotes

Sites along the Silk Road
Valleys of Xinjiang